Hans Staffan Folke Anger (born 1943), is a Swedish businessman. He was a member of the Swedish Parliament between 2006 and 2014.

Staffan Anger is one of the founders, and the Managing Director, of the model railway and miniature landscape attraction Miniature Kingdom in Kungsör.

References

Members of the Riksdag from the Moderate Party
Living people
1943 births